"Brown Sugar" is a song recorded by English singer-songwriter duo Ider for their debut album, Emotional Education. It was released on 1 February 2019 as the fourth single from the album.

Background and composition
"Brown Sugar" is a rhythm and blues-inspired track, which Marwick said was influenced by R&B artists such as Kendrick Lamar. Ider used a Roland synthesiser heavily throughout the track. They describe the track as "an empowering song about sex."

Music video
The "live" music video for "Brown Sugar" was released on 31 January 2019. The video features Ider performing the song live, in a dark room with red lighting. The video was directed by frequent Ider collaborator Lewis Knaggs.

Track listing
Digital download
 "Brown Sugar" – 3:36

Credits and personnel
 Megan Markwick – Vocals, synth, percussion
 Lily Somerville – Vocals, keyboard
 Ben Scott – drums
 Rodaidh McDonald – production

References

Ider (band) songs
2019 singles
2019 songs